Alexandra Hope Robotham (born 29 November 1993) is an Australian producer, songwriter, and multi-instrumentalist. They are the child of author Michael Robotham.

Career 

Alex worked as a producer and writer on Troye Sivan's debut album, Blue Neighbourhood, released in December 2015, and featured as a vocalist on the song 'BLUE'. 'Youth' won Song of the Year at the 2016 ARIA Awards, where Alex was also nominated for Producer of the Year and Engineer of the Year for their work on Blue Neighbourhood.

In 2016, Alex was named Breakthrough Songwriter of the Year at the APRA Awards. In 2017, they became an APRA ambassador  and were included in the Spotify 'Secret Genius' campaign as the ambassador for Australia.

Alex is known for their work with a variety of artists including Alanis Morissette, Selena Gomez, Troye Sivan, Tina Arena, Taylor Henderson, Wrabel, Tove Lo, Jack Antonoff, Guilherme de Sá and Broods.

Alex Hope was highlighted for their achievement during the 2018 Billboard Music Awards, alongside Ciara, Audra Mae and Taylor Parks, in partnership with Uber.

Personal life 

On July 1, 2021, Alex came out as non-binary via an Instagram post and announced their decision to change their gender pronouns to they/them, stating “Over the last year and a half I’ve had time to reflect, research and explore these feelings rather than push them away. What followed was a lot of lightbulb moments as I found vocabulary for how I had been feeling and a community of people who understood. I started to see myself. I could suddenly see myself in the future. I understood.”

Full discography

References

External links
Official Site
Alex Hope

1993 births
Living people
APRA Award winners
Australian songwriters
English emigrants to Australia
Australian record producers
Non-binary musicians
Australian LGBT musicians
English LGBT musicians